Ana M. L. G. Cannas da Silva (born 1968) is a Portuguese mathematician specializing in symplectic geometry and geometric topology. She works in Switzerland as an adjunct professor in mathematics at ETH Zurich.

Early life and education
Cannas was born in Lisbon. After studying at St. John de Britto College, she earned a licenciatura in mathematics in 1990 from the Instituto Superior Técnico in the University of Lisbon. She then went to the Massachusetts Institute of Technology for graduate studies, earning a master's degree in 1994 and completing her Ph.D. in 1996. Her dissertation, Multiplicity Formulas for Orbifolds, was supervised by Victor Guillemin.

Career
After a temporary position as Morrey Assistant Professor at the University of California, Berkeley, Cannas returned to the Instituto Superior Técnico as a faculty member in 1997. She took a second position as a senior lecturer and research scholar in mathematics at Princeton University in 2006, keeping at the same time her position at the Instituto Superior Técnico. In 2011 she moved from Princeton and the Instituto Superior Técnico to ETH Zurich.

Recognition
In 2009, the alumni of St. John de Britto College awarded Cannas their José Carlos Belchior Prize in honor of her achievements as an alumna of the school.

Books
Cannas is the author or coauthor of:
Geometric Models for Noncommutative Algebras (with Alan Weinstein, Amer. Math. Soc., 1999)
Lectures on Symplectic Geometry (Springer, 2001)
Introduction to Symplectic and Hamiltonian Geometry (Publ. Mat. IMPA, 2003)
Symplectic Geometry of Integrable Hamiltonian Systems (with Michèle Audin and Eugene Lerman, Birkhäuser 2003)

References

1968 births
Living people
20th-century Portuguese mathematicians
Portuguese women scientists
21st-century Portuguese mathematicians
Swiss women mathematicians
University of Lisbon alumni
Massachusetts Institute of Technology School of Science alumni
University of California, Berkeley College of Letters and Science faculty
Academic staff of the University of Lisbon
Princeton University faculty
Academic staff of ETH Zurich